The Bowen Bridge is a four-lane road bridge crossing the Derwent River in Tasmania, Australia.

Description
The bridge lies on the river about halfway between the Tasman Bridge and the Bridgewater Bridge.

The Bowen Bridge was built by Leighton Contractors with Federal Government funds following the collapse of the Tasman Bridge in 1975.

The bridge cost 49 million to construct and was officially opened on 23 February 1984. The Bowen Bridge was built with the intention of assisting the commuters of Hobart, should something happen to the Tasman Bridge. The bridge is named after John Bowen who settled the first European Colony in Tasmania at Risdon Cove, which later would be moved to the other side of the Derwent to form Hobart.

Gallery

References

External links

History

Bridges in Hobart
Bridges completed in 1984
Road bridges in Tasmania
Cantilever bridges
Concrete bridges in Australia
1984 establishments in Australia